Hermann Jöckel (8 October 1920 – 2 June 1991) was a German footballer who played as a goalkeeper. He won the German football championship with VfR Mannheim in 1949, and briefly managed the club in the 2. Fußball-Bundesliga Süd in 1975.

External links

1920 births
1991 deaths
Sportspeople from Wiesbaden
German footballers
Association football goalkeepers
Eintracht Frankfurt players
VfR Mannheim players
German football managers
VfR Mannheim managers
2. Bundesliga managers
Footballers from Hesse
20th-century German people